BJW may refer to:

 the IATA code for Bajawa Soa Airport, Indonesia
 Big Japan Pro Wrestling